Patrick Andy (born c. 1960, Clarendon Parish, Jamaica) is a reggae singer, whose stage name is a reference to his similarity to the older reggae singer Horace Andy.

Biography
Patrick Andy began singing at church and in school, and began his recording career working with Yabby You in the mid-1970s, often covering songs by Horace Andy. In 1978 he had a hit with "Woman, Woman, Woman", in combination with Ranking Barnabus, and a solo hit with "My Angel". In the early 1980s he began recording with producer Joseph Hoo Kim at Channel One Studios, and further hits followed with "Tired Fe Lick Weed Inna Bush" and "Pretty Me". He had further hits with "Get Up Stand Up" (1984), "Smiling", and "Sting Me a Sting, Shock Me a Shock", recorded for Prince Jammy in 1985. More hits followed and Andy recorded a number of "clash" albums, where tracks were split between Andy and a series of "opponents", including Wayne Smith, Frankie Jones, Half Pint, and Horace Andy.

Discography
Showdown vol. 7 (1984) Channel One/Hitbound (with Wayne Smith)
Two New Superstars (1985) Burning Sounds (with Frankie Jones)
Clash of the Andys (1985) Thunder Bolt (with Horace Andy)

References

External links
Patrick Andy at Roots Archives

Jamaican reggae musicians
People from Clarendon Parish, Jamaica
Living people
1960s births